St. Albans, Vermont may refer to:

St. Albans (town), Vermont, established 1763, a town in Franklin County, Vermont, U.S.
St. Albans (city), Vermont, established 1902, a city in Franklin County, Vermont, U.S.

See also
St. Albans Bay, Vermont, an unincorporated village in the town of St. Albans, Vermont, U.S.
St. Albans Raid, the northernmost land action of the American Civil War, 1864
St. Albans station (Vermont), the northern terminus of the Vermonter train service